Secretary of the Interior may refer to:

 Secretary of the Interior (Mexico)
 Interior Secretary of Pakistan
 Secretary of the Interior and Local Government (Philippines)
 United States Secretary of the Interior

See also
Interior ministry for other countries